The 1892 United States presidential election in South Dakota took place on November 8, 1892. All contemporary 44 states were part of the 1892 United States presidential election. Voters chose four electors to the Electoral College, which selected the president and vice president. South Dakota participated in its first ever presidential election, having been admitted as the 40th state on November 2, 1889.

The state was won by the Republican ticket of incumbent President Benjamin Harrison of Indiana and his running mate Whitelaw Reid of New York, by a margin of 11.84%. He defeated independent James B. Weaver of Iowa and his running mate James G. Field of Virginia (both of whom ran under the Populist banner nationally), and the Democratic ticket of former (and future) President Grover Cleveland of New York and his running mate Adlai Stevenson of Illinois.

Results

Results by county

See also
 United States presidential elections in South Dakota

Notes

References

South Dakota
1892
1892 South Dakota elections